The 2012 season was Buriram's 10th consecutive season in Thailand's top division. Buriram United will be competing in the 2014 AFC Champions League.

Kor Royal Cup

As 2013 Thai Premier League and 2013 Thai FA Cup champions, Buriram played against 2013 Thai Premier League runners-up Muangthong United. The 79th Kor Royal Cup was held at 1 February. The match was normally played at the Supachalasai Stadium in Bangkok, but due to the 2013–14 Thai political crisis the match was moved to Suphanburi Stadium, Suphanburi.

Toyota Premier Cup

Buriram will be playing against Nagoya Grampus in the 2014 Toyota Premier Cup. Buriram won the 2014 Toyota Premier Cup 5-4 from a penalty shootout.

Thai FA Cup

Thai League Cup

Thai Premier League

AFC Champions League

Players

First team squad

Out on loan

Transfers

In

Out

References

Buriram United
Buriram United F.C. seasons